Morocco–Yugoslavia relations were historical foreign relations between Morocco and now split-up Socialist Federal Republic of Yugoslavia. Two countries established formal bilateral relations on 2 March 1957. Both countries were founding members of the Non-Aligned Movement. Moroccan king Hassan II supported Yugoslav bid to host the first conference of the movement in 1961 even over the candidacy of Cairo. The belief was that Yugoslav bid will “increase the possibility of wider Arab participation” irrespective of some internal divisions. Yugoslav diplomacy on its part gave high priority to country's relations with non-bloc Mediterranean countries.

The issue of Western Sahara in bilateral relations
Friendly initial relations between the two countries suffered from the unresolved issue of the Western Sahara which gained prominence among some Non-Aligned countries, including some of the major Yugoslav partners. As Yugoslavia was the first European country which recognized the independence of Algeria some NAM member states believed that they will be able to pressure Belgrade to be the first European country to recognize the Sahrawi Arab Democratic Republic. During the Polisario Front visit to Belgrade led by Mustafa Ould Salek, Minister of Foreign Affairs of Yugoslavia Miloš Minić excused Yugoslav president from the meeting by his heavy workload burden at the time. Minić and president Tito subsequently met Prime Minister of Morocco Maati Bouabid where the Western Sahara was discussed. While Yugoslav side showed some dissatisfaction with perceived Moroccan rigidity over the issue, Moroccan side appreciated the friendly atmosphere in which concerns were shared. On 28 November 1984 Yugoslavia recognized the Sahrawi Arab Democratic Republic. Yugoslav recognition was 61 recognition and the first one (and alongside 1987 Albanian the only one) in Europe. This led to a 4 years long period of rupture in formal relations between the two countries. Yugoslav decision was subsequently recalled by Serbia and Montenegro (one of the successor states) in early 2000's which led to development of relations between Serbia and Morocco centered over the shared views on the status of Western Sahara and Kosovo.

List of bilateral state visits

Yugoslav visits to Morocco
 1-6 March 1961: Josip Broz Tito

See also
Yugoslavia and the Non-Aligned Movement
Yugoslavia and the Organisation of African Unity
Morocco–European Union relations
Yugoslavia–European Communities relations
Mediterranean Games
Agadir Crisis
July Crisis
Morocco in the Eurovision Song Contest
Yugoslavia in the Eurovision Song Contest
Death and state funeral of Josip Broz Tito
Morocco at the 1984 Winter Olympics

References

Morocco
Yugoslavia
Bosnia and Herzegovina–Morocco relations
Croatia–Morocco relations
Morocco–Serbia relations